Yuvatharam Kadilindi is a 1980 Telugu-language drama film directed by Dhavala Satyam. It was produced by Madala Ranga Rao of Navatharam Pictures. It stars Murali Mohan and Raadhika.The film won three Nandi Awards.

The plot is based on socialist principles and the youth movement.

Plot

Cast

Soundtrack
 "Allare Pallavi Anduke Allari" - 
 "Ashayala Pandirilo Anuragam Sandadilo" (Lyrics: C. Narayana Reddy; Music: T. Chalapathi Rao; Singer: V. Ramakrishna)
 "Nandare Lokamento Chitramura Nandare Rangurangula Ratnamura" {Burrakatha}
 "O Chinnadana Ennenno Vannechinnelunnadana Eluru Chinnadana" (Lyrics: C. Narayana Reddy; Music: T. Chalapathi Rao)
 "Yuvatharam Kadilindi" (Lyrics: C. Narayana Reddy; Music: T. Chalapathi Rao)

Reception 
Bose of Andhra Patrika wrote positively about the direction, story, photography and the performance of the cast. K. Ganapathi Rao of Sitara Weekly appreciated the movie and reviewed positively about the story, direction and the performance of the cast.

Accolades
Nandi Awards - 1980
 Best Feature Film - Gold - Madala Ranga Rao
 Best Actor - M. Prabhakar Reddy 
 Second Best Story Writer - Madala Ranga Rao

References

External links
 

1980 films
1980s Telugu-language films